Pemmaraju Sreenivasa Rao (born in 1942 in Andhra Pradesh, India) also known as Sreenivasa Rao Pemmaraju or Dr. P.S. Rao, is a distinguished Indian international lawyer that headed the Legal and Treaties Division, Ministry of External Affairs, India, and was the chief legal advisor of India on international law matters from 1985 to 2002. He was Judge AD HOC of International Court of Justice in the case concerning sovereignty over Pedra Branca/Pulau Batu Pateh, Middle Rocks and South Ledge (Malaysia/Singapore) (2004–2008). He was a member of the International Law Commission from 1987 to 2006  and a Special Rapporteur for the subject of Prevention and Liability. International Law Commission and Chairman of International Law Commission

Presently, he is a Special adviser in the office of the Attorney-General, State of Qatar and Visiting Professor at the Center for International law studies, Jawaharlal Nehru University, New Delhi. He is also an honorary visiting professor at Damodaram Sanjivayya National Law University, Visakhapatnam.

He was also a member of Bay of Bengal Maritime Boundary Arbitration tribunal (Bangladesh/India) (2010–2014).

Education
Dr. P.S Rao was educated at Andhra University, Waltair, India, and at Yale Law School (1967–1970). He earned a Bachelor of Laws and a Master of Laws degree with specialization in international law from Andhra and also an LL.M. and J.S.D. from Yale. Professor Rao worked as a Post Doctoral Fellow at the Woodrow Wilson International Center for Scholars, Washington, D.C., and at the Marine Policy Center of Woods Hole Oceanographic Institution, Woods Hole, Massachusetts. He published Public Order of the Ocean Resources and has contributed several articles on the negotiation of the Law of the Sea Convention, 1982. Rao participated in its negotiations from 1976-1984.

Post-Doctoral Works:

 Fellow, the Woodrow Wilson International Center for Scholars, Washington, DC.
 Fellow, Marine Policy Programme, Woods Hole Oceanographic Institution, Woods Hole, Mass., USA.
 Research Associate, The Indian School of International Studies, Sapru House, New Delhi,

Career
Biography of Pemmaraju Sreenivasa Rao

References

 The Public Order of Ocean Resources: A Critique of the Contemporary Law of the Sea
 List of members of the International Law Commission
 Pedra Branca dispute
 Petra Branca Separate Opinion
 Role of Soft Law in the Development of International Law
 Faculty at University of Michigan Law School
 Audio Visual Library of International Law
http://students.law.umich.edu/mjil/uploads/articles/v25n4-rao.pdf
 Bay of Bengal Maritime Boundary Arbitration (Bangladesh/India)
 Supreme Court judge, MEA ex-secretary slug it out for International Court of Justice post

1942 births
20th-century Indian lawyers
International Law Commission
Living people
Members of the International Law Commission